The 81st Texas Legislature began meeting in regular session on January 11, 2009.  The regular session adjourned sine die on June 1, 2009.

Rick Perry, the Governor of Texas, called a special session of the Legislature on July 1, 2009.  The Legislature passed two bills, both related to the sunset process, and adjourned sine die on July 10.

All members of the House of Representatives and 13 members of the Senate were elected on 4 November 2008.

Party summary

Senate

House of Representatives

The numbers above reflect the partisan composition of the House at the beginning of the legislative session in January 2009. On November 6, 2009, Chuck Hopson (D—Jacksonville) announced he was changing his affiliation to Republican, resulting in 77 Republicans and 73 Democrats. On February 3, 2010, Rep. Terri Hodge (D—Dallas) announced she would resign due to pending felony charges against her. This left the House with 77 Republicans, 72 Democrats and one vacancy.

The composition of the State Senate has remained unchanged since the beginning of the 81st Legislature.

Officers

Senate
 Lieutenant Governor: David Dewhurst (R)
 President Pro Tempore: Robert Duncan (R)

House of Representatives
 Speaker of the House: Joe Straus (R-San Antonio)
 Speaker Pro Tempore: Craig Eiland (D-Galveston)

Members

Senate

House of Representatives

References

External links

81 Texas Legislature
2009 in Texas
2009 U.S. legislative sessions